Telescopus obtusus, commonly known as the Egyptian cat snake, is a species of snake in the family Colubridae. 

The species is native to northern Africa, where it can be found in Egypt, Ethiopia, Eritrea, Sudan, Somalia, northern Kenya, Tanzania, the Central African Republic, Chad, and Uganda.

The snake is mainly nocturnal and lives in deserts near vegetated areas.

References

Telescopus
Reptiles described in 1834
Reptiles of Africa
Taxa named by Adolph Reuss